The Moldova Philharmonic Orchestra is a Romanian symphony orchestra located in Iași, Romania. The name "Moldova" in the title refers to the historical region of Moldavia.

History

During the 18 and 19th century, Iași, as the main city and capital of the former Principality of Moldavia, had been closely connected to European musical life, and great European musicians used to play in the city. In 1860, Conservatory of music and dramatic art was founded, followed, in 1868, by the Iași Philharmonic Society. The first full season of concerts was performed during 1905–1906.

Moldova State Philharmonic, as an institution with permanent artistic activity, held its inaugural concert on 9 October 1942, conducted by George Enescu. Its primary performing venue is located in the former Notre Dame de Sion (Sacré-Cœur) Institute's chapel, which is listed in the National Register of Historic Monuments. The main auditorium seats 560, and is named after the conductor Ion Baciu; the second auditorium seats 300, and is named after the composer Gavriil Musicescu. A smaller hall, with 144 seats, named after the composer Eduard Caudella, is located at the first floor of the Balș House, the same building which hosted, on 18 January 1847, the concert of the pianist and composer Franz Liszt.

See also
 Iași Romanian National Opera
 George Enescu National University of Arts
 List of symphony orchestras in Europe
 List of concert halls

References

External links

 www.filarmonicais.ro - Official website
 Balș House at arhitectura-1906.ro
 Filarmonica "Moldova" la 65 de ani

Philharmonic Orchestra
Romanian orchestras
Musical groups established in 1918